Isotornis is a genus of moths of the family Yponomeutidae.

Species
Isotornis nephelobathra - Meyrick, 1935 

Yponomeutidae